Adam Kowalski   (born 16 September 1994) is a Polish volleyball player, a member of Poland men's national volleyball team B and Germany club Berlin Recycling Volleys.

Career

National team
On April 2, 2015 was appointed to the Polish national team by head coach Stephane Antiga. After the training camp in Spała he went to team B of Polish national team led by Andrzej Kowal. He took part in 1st edition of 2015 European Games.

Sporting achievements

Clubs

National championships
 2009/2010  Polish Championship U19, with KS Norwid Częstochowa
 2010/2011  Polish Championship U19, with KS Norwid Częstochowa
 2011/2012  Polish Championship U21, with KS Norwid Częstochowa
 2012/2013  Polish Championship U21, with KS Norwid Częstochowa
 2012/2013  Polish Championship U23, with SMS PZPS Spała

Individually
 2012 Polish Championship U21 - Best Libero

References

External links
 PlusLiga player profile

1994 births
Living people
Sportspeople from Częstochowa
Polish men's volleyball players
Czarni Radom players
Volleyball players at the 2015 European Games
European Games competitors for Poland
AZS Częstochowa players
BKS Visła Bydgoszcz players